An ascender is a device (usually mechanical) used for directly ascending a rope, or for facilitating protection with a fixed rope when climbing on very steep mountain terrain.

Ascenders can also be used as a braking component within a rope hauling system, often used in rescue situations.

Use 
Ascenders are usually used in pairs, and offer similar functionality to friction knots, but are faster, safer and easier to use, albeit still with consequences in weight and in security (as ascenders can, even with a locking carabiner, come off the rope, and fail by shredding the rope at high loads, rather than slipping and fusing as with friction knots). A mechanical ascender employs a cam which allows the device to slide freely in the intended direction of movement, but provide a firm grip on the rope when pulled in the opposite direction. To prevent an ascender from accidentally coming off the rope, a locking mechanism or trigger is deployed. The ascender is first attached to the climber's harness by a piece of webbing or sling, and then is clipped onto the rope and locked on.

Ascenders are usually used in pairs, so that one is free to be slid up the rope whilst the other bears the weight of the climber. The ascender which has just been slid upwards is then made to take the climbers load, so locking him to the rope, and freeing the other one so it, too, can then be slid upwards too. The process is then repeated to ascend the rope.

For climbing on with a fixed rope attached for security (for example, to snow anchors on a steep slope) only one ascender is used, keeping the other hand free for holding an ice axe.

Ascenders are not typically used on free climbing routes, where a climber uses his or her hands and feet on the rock, climbing the features, edges, cracks, and pockets that the route provides without artificial aids. Instead, they are more likely to be used in aid climbing.

Jumar
One such ascender device is a jumar, named for its manufacturer Jümar Pangit, a company in turn named after jumar inventors Adolph Jüsi and Walter Marti. 

From the name of the Swiss firm Jümar Pangit which manufactured it, in turn from the surnames of Adolf Jüsy and Walter Marti. Jusi was studying eagles for the Swiss Government, and needed an ascender. Marti developed the Jumar for him.
The first iteration of the tool was sold in 1958. The device's name also engendered the verb "to jumar" for the process of using such a device. In jumaring, the second climber (the one who belays the lead climber on the route) uses ascenders to climb the rope instead of climbing directly on the rock. Other terms for this process include ascending and jugging. This process is similar to prusiking, except using an ascender device instead of friction knots.

In his memoir Life Is Meeting, John Hunt, leader of the 1953 British Mount Everest expedition, credits the jumar with enabling climbers "to climb at alpine standards even at high altitudes".

Non-mechanical devices 
In place of mechanical ascenders, one or more thin rope slings (or prusik loops) may be used which can be slid along the thicker climbing rope when not under tension. These friction knots will lock under load to enable the climber to use the strength of their leg to step up and ascend the rope. Prusik knots are much lighter, but are not capable of taking a dynamic load, such as arresting a falling climber, because they are prone to melting or fusing under such extreme forces.

Single-rope technique
In caving, ascending a rope by means of mechanical devices is often necessary and is the main alternative to ladder use. This is termed single-rope technique. The rock which forms the cave is often wet, slippery, relatively featureless and often unreachable from the necessary rope locations. So climbing the rope may well be preferable to climbing the rock or a ladder, provided that a belay location that provides an ascent has already been found. Although climbers may regard a climb as a challenge to be tackled with minimal aids, cavers are likely to consider it as an obstacle to their progress to be overcome as conveniently as possible, and are more inclined to make use of mechanical ascenders.

History 
The first mechanical rope ascending devices were created by Henri Brenot, and were used in France both for mountaineering and caving as early as 1934.

Jümar Pangit, a Swiss manufacturer located then in Reichenbach (Switzerland), was founded by Adolph Jüsi and Walter Marti. Jüsi was studying eagles for the Swiss government and needed to ascend on ropes in order to perform his work, so Marti developed the ascender for him. In 1958, the first jumar was introduced to the climbing market. This page (archived) gives an overview on the older jumar models. A current model is still in production.

French caver Fernand Petzl developed a mechanical rope ascender in 1968, and his company Petzl continues to produce both handled and handleless models that are popular with mountaineers and cavers today.

Other countries, notably the United States, have also produced rope ascenders. Other names for different styles of ascenders include 'ropeman' and 'tibloc'.

References 

Caving equipment
Climbing equipment
Mountaineering equipment